Badwater is a locale in Inyo County, California.

Badwater has never had a permanent population, though there is a 1946 report of a campsite at Badwater.

Badwater is also known for being the start of the Badwater Ultramarathon, billed as the toughest foot race on the planet.

References

Populated places in the Mojave Desert
Unincorporated communities in California
Unincorporated communities in Inyo County, California